Tin-Tin Ho (born 3 September 1998) is an English table tennis player. She has won multiple national titles, as well as two Commonwealth silver medals, and appeared at the 2020 Summer Olympics.

Career

2014 Commonwealth Games
She competed for England in the mixed doubles event at the 2014 Commonwealth Games, where she won a silver medal with partner Liam Pitchford.

National champion
In March 2016, at the age of 17, she won her first national women's singles title, when she also retained the women's doubles and mixed doubles titles.

2018 Commonwealth Games
At the 2018 Commonwealth Games in Gold Coast, Australia, Ho and Pitchford repeated their silver medal from four years earlier and she was also part of the England squad which won team bronze, alongside Kelly Sibley, Maria Tsaptsinos and Denise Payet.

2020 Summer Olympics
In qualifying for the delayed 2020 Summer Olympics, Ho became the first British woman since Atlanta 1996 to qualify for an Olympic games in the single's table tennis event. She lost in the first round to Manika Batra of India.

See also
 List of England players at the World Team Table Tennis Championships

References

External links

1998 births
Living people
English female table tennis players
English people of Chinese descent
Commonwealth Games silver medallists for England
Table tennis players at the 2014 Commonwealth Games
Commonwealth Games medallists in table tennis
Sportspeople from London
Table tennis players at the 2018 Commonwealth Games
Table tennis players at the 2019 European Games
European Games competitors for Great Britain
People educated at the City of London School for Girls
Table tennis players at the 2020 Summer Olympics
Olympic table tennis players of Great Britain
Table tennis players at the 2022 Commonwealth Games
Medallists at the 2014 Commonwealth Games
Medallists at the 2018 Commonwealth Games